Merna may refer to the following people:

Given name
 Merna Barry (born Minnie Bagelman; 1923–1976), American entertainer 
 Merna Kennedy (1908–1944), American actress 
 Merna Summers (born 1933), Canadian short story writer

Surname
 Gemma Merna (born 1984), English actress

Arts and entertainment
 Merna is the name of the main character of the 1928 film The Circus by Charlie Chaplin.

See also
 Myrna